A United States Air Force air control squadron is a group assigned to provide combat air control services in the form of radar, surveillance identification, weapons control, Battle Management and theater communications data link to the forces or area it is assigned to. This list contains squadrons inactive, active, and historical.

List

Air Control